Sannicandro di Bari is a town and comune in the Metropolitan City of Bari, Apulia, southern Italy.

Main sights
The main attraction of Sannicandro is the Hohenstaufen-Norman castle, located in the centre of the city. It is composed of two structures one within the other: the first one was built by the Byzantines in 916, with a line of walls in stone with six quadrangular towers. After the Norman conquest of Bari in 1071, the castle was restored. During the reign in Sicily of Frederick II, Holy Roman Emperor (1198-1250), the structure was adapted for use as a castle.

Other sights include:
Church of Santa Maria Assunta
Monumento ai caduti

Notable people
 

Francesco Racanelli (1904–1978), doctor, pranotherapist and writer

References

External links

Cities and towns in Apulia